"If We Hold on Together" is the theme song to the 1988 film The Land Before Time, and is performed by American singer Diana Ross. Played during the film's ending credits, it was released on the film's soundtrack as well on Ross' nineteenth studio album, The Force Behind the Power (1991). It was also released as the soundtrack's first and only single on November 5, 1988 by MCA. The song was written by James Horner and Will Jennings, and produced by Peter Asher. It reached the top 30 on the US adult contemporary chart, peaked at #23, as well as giving Ross her biggest hit ever in Japan (No. 1) and later reaching No. 11 in the UK. There was no music video promoted for the song.

"If We Hold on Together" was covered by Anndi McAfee and Aria Curzon, the voices of Cera and Ducky in The Land Before Time series since the fifth film, for The Land Before Time: Sing-Along Songs in 1997. The song was also covered by multi-Na Hoku Hanohano award-winning Hawaiian music artist Keali'i Reichel on his 1995 debut album Kawaipunahele. Jordin Sparks, a winner of American Idol season 6 also covered this song.

Critical reception 
Peter Fawthrop from AllMusic described the song as "a soaring, splendid ballad", noting that it "is somewhat Biblical in its message, "Valley mountain, there is a fountain that washes our tears all away"." Katherine Cusumano from Bustle preferred it to "My Heart Will Go On", writing "It's shamelessly sappy, but it perfectly suits the dinosaur tearjerker it appears in." James Masterton declared it as Ross' "welcome return to the slushy soul ballads only she can do properly." Pan-European magazine Music & Media stated, "Ross is the boss when it comes to romantic ballads. This one will have to share the air with all those flying angels during the Christmas period." Rotoscopers said it was the "cherry on top to this great musical score from James Horner." The site also said it "brings forth the same endearing qualities as "Somewhere Out There" from An American Tail."

Personnel 

 Diana Ross – lead vocals
 Lee Sklar – bass
 Russ Kunkel – drums
 Waddy Wachtel – guitar
 Guy Moon, Randy Kerber – keyboards
 Michael Fisher – percussion
 David Campbell – BGV arrangements, orchestra arrangements and conductor
 Gavyn Wright – orchestra leader
 Isobel Griffiths – orchestra contractor
 Kate Markowitz, Valerie Carter – backing vocals

Charts

Certifications

References 

The Land Before Time
1980s ballads
1988 songs
1988 singles
1989 singles
Pop ballads
Contemporary R&B ballads
Soul ballads
Songs written for animated films
Diana Ross songs
Songs written for films
Songs written by James Horner
Songs with lyrics by Will Jennings
MCA Records singles